Sonia Tomara (26 February 1897– 7 September 1982) was a Russian-born journalist who is regarded as the first female war correspondent of World War II.

Life
Sonia was born to Michael and Olga Mamontoff Tomara on 26 February 1897 in St. Petersburg, Russia where she graduated with a degree in chemical engineering from the Moscow University for Women. In 1920, she fled with her mother to France during the Russian Revolution where she got employed as a political reporter and editor for Le Matin until in 1928 when she was recruited by the New York Herald Tribune.

During the 1930s, Sonia covered major events including the rise of Adolf Hitler and the battle of France following her return to Europe. In 1940, she returned to the United States after the 1940 armistice. In 1942, she was elected president of the New York Newspaper Women's Club. She was accredited as a United States war correspondent later in the year and was assigned to the Far East to cover political stories in the China-Burma-India Theater. Jean Lyons of the Chinese News Bureau served as acting club president while she was away.

Sonia moved to China in May 1943 where she covered Nationalist Chinese military actions against Japan on the Yangtze River. She later moved to North Africa, covering the Allied Forces Headquarters in North Africa. In 1944, Sonia Tomara returned to Paris and resigned from the New York Herald Times following her marriage to William Clark in 1947.

Death
In August 1982, Sonia was hospitalized after suffering a stroke. She died on 7 September at the Princeton Medical Center, New Jersey, U.S.

References

Bibliography

1897 births
1982 deaths
Journalists from New York City
White Russian emigrants to France
French emigrants to the United States